The Communist Party of Turkey (TKP) is a communist party in Turkey. It was founded as the Socialist Power Party (SİP) on 16 August 1993. In 2001, the party changed its name to the Communist Party of Turkey (TKP) and took over the historical legacy of the TKP.

History

After the 12 September Coup & Gelenek era
The TKP that has been founded in 2001 has its roots in 1978. In that year a faction called Sosyalist İktidar (Socialist Power) has voiced concerns about the main political line of the Workers Party of Turkey (Türkiye İşçi Partisi or TİP). The group claimed that the party's activities were not consistent with the programme of a revolutionary party, defending socialist revolution. The group headed by Yalçın Küçük and Metin Çulhaoğlu argued that due to oppressive terror atmosphere in the country the party gave in to unification policy within the left wing thus losing the perspective of taking power. The group has printed the Sosyalist İktidar magazine during 1978-80 but it was not  effective. After the coup of 12 September 1980 the activities of the group almost stopped like nearly all other party or groups.

After the coup, the group aimed to consolidate its cadres and its theoretical base. However, in 1982 a division has occurred within the group between Yalçın Küçük supporters and Metin Çulhaoğlu followers. Yalçın Küçük and his group published Toplumsal Kurtuluş while Metin Çulhaoğlu and his group published Gelenek magazine after his release from jail in 1986. TKP stems from Gelenek magazine organisation. Gelenek defined the left in three categories as; orthodox, Revolutionary Democratic and new. From this perspective it defended the orthodox left view and criticized the ongoing Mikhail Gorbachev's Glasnost and Perestroika processes in the Soviet Union.

In this period the Gelenek group announced that in the upcoming 1987 General Elections it will not support any intra-system political party. It had worked with other left wing groups to campaign for independent members for parliament. During this era Gelenek group entered into negotiations for building a left wing party where all groups may be brought together but this process had failed. After the collapse of these talks, Gelenek group had formed Socialist Turkey Party (Sosyalist Türkiye Partisi) STP on 6 November 1992 in Ankara. The Political Bureau of the party were made up of seven people: Ali Önder Öndeş (President), Kemal Okuyan (Vice-President), Metin Çulhaoğlu, Süleyman Baba, Uğur Özdemir, Işıtan Gündüz, Aydemir Güler. However, due to some parts in the party programme Socialist Turkey Party was closed on 30 November 1993 by the order of Constitutional Court.

SİP era (1993–2001)

After the closure of STP, the party cadres immediately formed the Party for Socialist Power (Sosyalist İktidar Partisi) SİP. In the same year an internal division occurred within the party, culminating in the exit of Metin Çulhaoğlu and his followers. After this incident the head of the party became Aydemir Güler.

During December 1995 general elections the party had no right to enter the elections. SİP entered the Labour, Peace and Freedom Bloc headed by HADEP. After the election, the party had urged the participants to proceed with the bloc however the components refused to further collaborate with Kurdish nationalists. SİP had led the 1996 Istanbul University occupation and sit-in acts protesting the fees. The party had also made its name heads by holding an unannounced meeting in the banned Taksim Square on May Day 1996. After the exposure of the Susurluk scandal the party encouraged the masses to take to the streets for protesting the regime that had connections with politicians-mobs-drug dealers etc. In the same year the party started a campaign that demanded the closure of the McDonald's in the Middle East Technical University Campus, Ankara.

In 1999 SİP entered the general elections for the first time under the leadership of Aydemir Güler and received 37,680 votes (%0.12). During the campaign process for the general elections party member Hüseyin Duman was shot dead by a rightist politician İhsan Bal.

In 2000 SİP emphasized on the ban on founding a party with "communist" adjective on its name. Thus party member Yalçın Cerit had applied to the authorities and found a new party called Communist Party (Komünist Parti). In spite of the law forbidding to form a party with the word "communist" in the name no legal steps were taken by the officials while SİP party members organised activities with both party names.

Founding of TKP and onwards (starting with 2001)
In the 6th Extraordinary Congress of SİP which was held on 11 November 2001, it has been announced that Communist Party has merged with the Party for Socialist Power and the name of the party has been changed to Communist Party of Turkey (Türkiye Komünist Partisi) TKP. With this congress communists from other organisations including the followers of Metin Çulhaoğlu had joined the ranks. The Central Committee was formed with the following: Aydemir Güler, Kemal Okuyan, Süleyman Baba, Uğur İşlek, Erkin Özalp, Hüseyin Karabulut, Kurtuluş Kılçer, Oğuz Kavala, Hüsnü Atlıkan, Yalçın Cerit, Mesut Odman, Gülay Dinçel, Alper Dizdar, Gamze Erbil, Mehmet Kuzulugil, Yaşar Çelik, Nihal İmeryüz, Tunç Tatoğlu, Sedat Cengiz, Haluk İmeryüz, Arif Basa, Atilla Gökçek. Aydemir Güler was selected as President and Kemal Okuyan as General Secretary. The founding date of the party was declared as 10 September 1920 Baku Congress.

During this period some of the main campaigns and achievements of the party were:

Rallying against the Iraq War when possible Turkish involvement was voted against on 1 March 2003. The resolution would have paved the way for relocation of US troops in Turkish soil and possible involvement of Turkish troops in Iraqi operations.
Founding of Committees against invasion and Peace Foundation.
Campaigning against the 2004 NATO Summit in İstanbul
Founding of Patriotic Front (Yurtsever Cephe) against growing influence of imperialism
Holding a mass rally against the AKP Government in 2008 in Kadıköy, İstanbul
The Party entered 2011 General Elections and received 61,236 votes (0.14%).
The Party played a pivotal role in the 2009-2010 Tekel workers' industrial action and 2013 Gezi Park protests

2014 local elections 
In the 2014 local elections, TKP had 51,155 votes and 0.11% of the votes across Turkey. Fatih Mehmet Maçoğlu was elected the mayor in Ovacık district of Tunceli province.

Dissolution and reconstruction
After a period of internal strife, two rival factions of TKP reached a consensus on 15 July 2014 to freeze the activities of the party and that neither faction shall use the name and emblem of TKP. The faction led by Erkan Baş and Metin Çulhaoğlu adopted the name People's Communist Party of Turkey and the faction led by Kemal Okuyan and Aydemir Güler founded the Communist Party.

On 22 January 2017, a congress was held by the initiation of seven well-known figures in the left-wing politics. The congress was embraced by independent communists and also by the Communist Party. The congress announced that the TKP name will not be left unguarded and declared that TKP is back in the political scene.

2019 local elections 
In the municipal election of 31 March 2019, TKP's candidate Fatih Mehmet Maçoğlu won in the mainly Zaza Kurdish Dersim Province, with 32% of the votes cast. The Kurdish opposition party, the People's Democratic Party, came second with 28%, followed by the social democratic and Kemalist Republican People's Party at 20%.

Organisational structure 
The structure of the party is consistent with the orthodox Marxist-Leninist Communist Party. The basic unit is called cell, and the party has various cells in workshops, plants, neighbourhoods. These cells form the basis of district committees and eventually city committees. The deciding organ of the party is Party conference where delegates from every organisation determine the Central Committee which has the authority between congresses. The Central Committee determines within itself a General Secretary whose responsibilities are; making sure that the Central Committee works are coordinated, the political and organisational activities of the party are guided closely and representing the party in national and international platforms.

Relations with other parties and internationalism
The party sees AKP, CHP, MHP and HDP as bourgeois parties and classifies them as opposing class parties. The party has warm relations with the Federation of Socialist Assemblies (Sosyalist Meclisler Federasyonu), and the two organisations formed an electoral alliance in several provinces in the 2019 Turkish local elections, which emerged victorious in the provincial centre of Tunceli.

In August 2022 it was announced in a press conference in Ankara, that the party along with the Left Party, the Communist Movement of Turkey and the Revolution Movement would form a coalition for the 2023 national election, called the Union of Socialist Forces.

The party defends an orthodox view in communist movement and urges the movement to define its borders clearly. The party is quite close to Communist Party of Greece and the Communist Party of the Workers of Spain in international level. It has ties with many communist and worker's parties in the Middle East, Caucasus and Balkans. It has close relations with the Communist Party of Cuba, leading a pioneer role in the solidarity for Cuba. TKP is a member of the Initiative of Communist and Workers' Parties. The party joins the efforts to build an international focal point by issuing a  magazine about communist theory called International Communist Review. TKP's youth wing, Communist Youth of Turkey and Leftist High Schools, are members of the World Federation of Democratic Youth.

Electoral performance 

In the 2007 election, the party obtained its best percentage result in Ardahan on the border with Georgia, where it got 1.42% with 787 votes, even though the party did not maintain offices in the province.

See also 

 Communist Party of Turkey (disambiguation)

References

External links

 
Programme of STP accessed on 17 August 2017 

1992 establishments in Turkey
2014 disestablishments in Turkey
2017 establishments in Turkey
Communist parties in Turkey
Far-left politics in Turkey
Political parties disestablished in 2014
Political parties established in 1992
Political parties established in 2017
International Meeting of Communist and Workers Parties